William Hayes (born June 1, 1943) is a former American football coach and college athletics administrator.  He retired as the athletic director at Winston-Salem State University in 2014. Hayes served as the head football coach at Winston-Salem State from 1976 to 1987 and at North Carolina A&T State University from 1988 to 2003, compiling a career college football record of 195–104–2.  In 27 seasons as a head coach, Hayes has the distinction of being the winningest coach at both football programs. He is an alumnus of North Carolina Central University.

Coaching career
Hayes started his coaching career as a running backs coach on the coaching staff at Wake Forest University, from 1973 to 1975, making him one of the first African-American coaches in the Atlantic Coast Conference.  At the Division II level at Winston-Salem State, the Rams under Hayes won three Central Intercollegiate Athletic Association (CIAA) titles, and made two Division II playoff appearances, in 1978 and 1987. At North Carolina A&T on the Division I-AA level, the Aggies under Hayes won three Mid-Eastern Athletic Conference (MEAC) titles and made two Division I-AA playoff appearances, in 1992 and 1999.  The Aggies also appeared in the now defunct post-season HBCU bowl game, the Heritage Bowl in 1991.

Hayes coached a number of players who went to play in the NFL or CFL: Timmy Newsome (running back), Donald Evans (defensive end), and Anthony Blaylock (defensive back) from Winston-Salem State, and Jamain Stephens (offensive lineman), Curtis Deloatch (defensive back), Maurice Hicks (running back), Michael Basnight (running back), Jamal Jones (wide receiver), Junius Coston (offensive line), Qasim Mitchell (offensive lineman) from North Carolina A&T.

Administrative career
Hayes became a university administrator after he ended his coaching career. He served as athletic director at his alma mater, North Carolina Central University in Durham, North Carolina, from 2003 to 2007, Florida A&M University in Tallahassee, Florida from December 2007 to December 2009, and Winston-Salem State University from 2010 to 2014.

Head coaching record

References

External links
 Bill Hayes Retiring as Winston-Salem State Athletics Director

1943 births
Living people
Florida A&M Rattlers and Lady Rattlers athletic directors
North Carolina A&T Aggies football coaches
North Carolina Central Eagles athletic directors
North Carolina Central Eagles football players
Sportspeople from Durham, North Carolina
Wake Forest Demon Deacons football coaches
Winston-Salem State Rams athletic directors
Winston-Salem State Rams football coaches
African-American coaches of American football
African-American players of American football
African-American college athletic directors in the United States
21st-century African-American people
20th-century African-American sportspeople